The 1958 Giro d'Italia was the 41st running of the Giro d'Italia, one of cycling's Grand Tour races. The Giro started in Milan, on 18 May, with a  stage and concluded back in Milan, on 8 June, with a  leg. A total of 120 riders from 15 teams entered the 20-stage race, which was won by Italian Ercole Baldini of the Legnano team. The second and third places were taken by Belgian Jean Brankart and Luxembourgian Charly Gaul, respectively.

Teams

A total of 15 teams were invited to participate in the 1958 Giro d'Italia. Each team sent a squad of eight riders, so the Giro began with a peloton of 120 cyclists. Out of the 120 riders that started this edition of the Giro d'Italia, a total of 77 riders made it to the finish in Milan.

The 15 teams that took part in the race were:

Route and stages

The route was released on 27 March 1958 in Saint Vincent.

The photofinish was introduced to the race, which allowed the rider's times to be determined to the hundredth of a second.

Classification leadership

One different jersey was worn during the 1958 Giro d'Italia. The leader of the general classification – calculated by adding the stage finish times of each rider – wore a pink jersey. This classification is the most important of the race, and its winner is considered as the winner of the Giro.

For the points classification, which awarded no jersey to its leader, cyclists were given points for finishing a stage in the top 15. This classification was also known as the Trofeo A. Carli. The mountains classification leader. The climbs were ranked in first and second categories. In this ranking, points were won by reaching the summit of a climb ahead of other cyclists. Although no jersey was awarded, there was also one classification for the teams, in which the stage finish times of the best three cyclists per team were added; the leading team was the one with the lowest total time.

Final standings

General classification

Mountains classification

Points classification

Intermediate sprints classification

Team classification

Minor awards

The race jury and the director established a classification for awards "on merit", which Giorgio Menini (San Pellegrino) won with six points. With this classification victory, Menini won 300,000 lire. Guido Boni (Bianchi), Guido Carlesi (Chlorodont), Alfredo Zagano (Asborno), Jesús Galdeano (Faema), and Gianni Ferlenghi (Bianchi) placed second in the classification and split 300,000 lire.

References

Citations

1958
1958 in Italian sport
1958 in road cycling
May 1958 sports events in Europe
June 1958 sports events in Europe
1958 Challenge Desgrange-Colombo